Ampang–Kuala Lumpur Elevated Highway (AKLEH),  (Malay: Lebuhraya Bertingkat Ampang–Kuala Lumpur), is the first elevated highway in Malaysia. The  elevated highway connects Ampang (Selangor) and Kuala Lumpur. This highway was built to reduce traffic jams at Jalan Ampang and make access to the city more convenient. Motorcycles and other vehicles with two wheels or fewer were banned from using this highway for safety reasons; however, the ban on motorcycles was lifted on 19 June 2008 because of escalating fuel prices. This highway connects Kuala Lumpur and Selangor state.

Route background
The Kilometre Zero is located at the entrance from Jalan Raja Abdullah at Jalan Sultan Ismail Interchange,  Kuala Lumpur.

History
The construction of the Ampang–Kuala Lumpur Elevated Highway was approved on 16 May 1996 when Prolintas was awarded the concession of the highway, which will end in 2029. Construction began in the same year at the banks of the Klang River and was completed in 2001. The highway was opened to traffic on 17 May 2001 after numerous delays, and the toll collection started on 1 June 2001.

Plans
The highway was designed to accommodate future expansion of the Jelatek–Kuala Lumpur Middle Ring Road 2 section from the current four-lane carriageway to six-lane carriageways. The expansion will take place along the northern bank of the Klang River and Ampang River. According to the concessionaire agreement between Prolintas and the federal government, Prolintas is required to expand the highway once the average daily traffic exceeds 93,000 vehicles daily. As a result, a chicane was formed right after the Exit 1203 Jelatek Interchange for Ampang-bound traffic. Prolintas will only be allowed to raise the toll rate once the upgrading works of the Jelatek–MRR2 section to six-lane carriageway begins.

On 5 November 2015, the upgrading works (called AKLEH Phase 2) of the AKLEH (Ampang-bound traffic) from Jelatek to Ampang-MRR2 was opened to traffic.

Features
Tunnel to Suria KLCC parking
Smooth access to Ampang and Kuala Lumpur
Spectacular scenery of Kuala Lumpur skyline from Ampang

Tolls
The Ampang–Kuala Lumpur Elevated Highway (AKLEH) uses open toll collection systems. Since 2015 all toll transactions at the highway's sole toll plaza have been conducted electronically via Touch 'n Go cards or SmartTAGs. Cash payments are no longer accepted. In October 2022, it was one of the four expressways maintained by PROLINTAS to have its toll rates deducted between 8% to 15%.

Toll rates
(Starting 20 October 2022)

List of interchanges

See also
Jalan Ampang

References

External links
Prolintas website
Ampang–Kuala Lumpur Elevated Highway

2001 establishments in Malaysia
Prolintas Expressway Networks
Expressways and highways in the Klang Valley